"Brenda's Got a Baby" is a song by American rapper 2Pac from his debut album, 2Pacalypse Now (1991). The song was first released as a promotional CD single a month prior to album's release and then, in February 1992, it was re-released as a double A-side single with the song "If My Homie Calls". The song, which features R&B singer Dave Hollister singing background vocals with Roniece Levias, is about a 12-year-old girl named Brenda who lives in a ghetto and has a baby she can't support. The song explores the issue of teen pregnancy and its effect on young mothers and their families. Like many of Shakur's songs, "Brenda's Got a Baby" draws from the plight of the impoverished. Using Brenda to represent young mothers in general, Shakur criticises the low level of support from the baby's father, the government, and society in general. Shakur wrote the song while filming the feature film Juice, after reading a newspaper article about a 12-year-old girl who became pregnant by her cousin and threw the baby into a trash compactor.

Music video

The video of the song is in black-and-white. It was made to visualize what Shakur narrates. The first part shows Shakur and "Brenda" and then the actual story starts. Ethel "Edy" Proctor portrays Brenda.

The video begins with "based on a true story," although the characters themselves are fictitious, Shakur wrote the song after reading a story in the newspaper of a 12-year-old girl getting pregnant by her cousin and trying to dispose of the baby in a trash can.

Parts of the video were included in Tupac: Resurrection, a 2003 documentary on 2Pac's life, in a television show later in the music video of "Ghetto Gospel", in the music video of "Changes" and appears as a bonus in its entirety on the film's DVD. Part of the video and song was played in 2Pac's biopic film, All Eyez on Me, released on June 16, 2017.

The video was directed by the Hughes brothers.

Charts

References

1991 debut singles
1991 songs
Incest in fiction
Songs about child abuse
Songs about parenthood
Songs with feminist themes
Songs written by Tupac Shakur
Tupac Shakur songs
1990s ballads
Black-and-white music videos